Loïc Prévot (born 10 February 1998, in Remire-Montjoly) is a French sprinter.

His personal best at 400 metres is 46.21 (Geneva, 15 June 2019). He anchored the French relay second in Super League at 2019 European Team Championships in Bydgoszcz, giving the podium to France for just half a point.

He also won the bronze medal at 2019 European Athletics U23 Championships.

References

External links
IAAF Athlete’s profile

Living people
1998 births
French male sprinters
People from Remire-Montjoly
20th-century French people
21st-century French people
European Athletics Championships medalists